was a village located in Tone District, Gunma Prefecture, Japan.

As of 2003, the village had an estimated population of 3,736 and a density of 132.67 persons per km². The total area was 28.16 km².

On February 13, 2005, Shirasawa, along with the village of Tone (also from Tone District), was merged into the expanded city of Numata.

External links
 Official website of Numata  (some English)

Dissolved municipalities of Gunma Prefecture